SS Gothenburg was an iron-hulled sail- and steamship that was built in England in 1854 and sailed between England and Sweden until 1862. She then moved to Australia, where she operated across the Tasman Sea to and from New Zealand until 1873, when she was rebuilt. After her rebuild she operated in the Australian coastal trade.

In February 1875 Gothenburg was wrecked in a storm on the Great Barrier Reef off the north coast of Queensland. 22 people survived in three lifeboats. Between 98 and 112 people were killed, including a number of civil servants and dignitaries.

Building
Charles Lungley & Co built Gothenburg at Millwall on the River Thames. Her launch on 1 April 1854 was marred by her colliding with the steamship Clyde. Clyde was sunk and Gothenburg sustained damage to her stern and her propeller.

She had a two-cylinder steam engine that was rated at 120 horsepower. She had three masts and was rigged as a barquentine. Her single funnel was set well aft, between her main and mizzen masts. She carried four lifeboats, two on each side.

Gothenburg first owner was the North of Europe Steam Navigation Company, who registered her at London. Under the Merchant Shipping Act 1854, her official number was 23071.

European and trans-Tasman services
The North of Europe SN Co operated Gothenburg between Irongate Wharf near the Tower of London and Sweden. In 1862 John H Blackwood bought her and she sailed to Australia, where Blackwood re-registered her in Melbourne. By 1866 her code letters were NQDB.

Gothenburg was one of the most modern vessels working in Australian waters in the 1860s, and became a popular ship as she was considered reliable. After several years on the trans-Tasman route between Australia and New Zealand, her owners transferred her to the Australian coastal service.

Rebuild and Australian coastal service

In 1873 Gothenburg was rebuilt at Adelaide to increase her range, cargo capacity and passenger accommodation.

By 1874 her owners were registered as McMeckan and Blackwood.

In November 1874, several shipowners were contracted for two years from the South Australian government to provide ten round trips between the colonial capital of Adelaide and its furthest outpost, Port Darwin. Port Darwin was feeling the effects of a gold rush at Pine Creek and growing quickly as a trade post with the Dutch East Indies. However, all the local banks sent their money, together with government paperwork and the Royal Mail, around the east coast to Adelaide. On successful completion of each voyage, the South Australian government would pay the owners £1000 sterling.

When Gothenburg left Port Darwin on Tuesday, 16 February 1875, Captain Robert George Augustus Pearce was under orders to make best possible speed. Pearce had been her captain on the Adelaide – Darwin run for some time and had built up a solid reputation. He was a man of the sea, a man of sobriety and kindness and was well respected by his fellow sea captains.

Amongst the approximately 98 passengers and 37 crew (surviving records vary) were government officials, circuit court judges, Darwin residents taking their first furlough and miners. Also aboard was the French Vice Consul Edouard Durand and James Millner, the medical officer in George W. Goyder's 1869 expedition to found the first colony at Port Darwin. There were also several prisoners aboard, bound for the Adelaide jail. Durand reportedly also carried a tin box with him containing gold sovereigns and coins worth in excess of £3,000.

In three days of fine weather, Gothenburg travelled  from Palmerston (Darwin) to Somerset on Cape York. The weather began to worsen so the ship stopped to take on ballast at Somerset. While she was anchored, conditions deteriorated to a point where both anchor chains parted. After the loss of the anchors, Gothenburg was forced to prematurely steam out  because of strong currents; at that point, she brought up for the night.

Two days later, Tuesday 23 February, Gothenburg passed Cooktown at about 2:00 pm. The wind and rain severely increased and cloud cover became so thick it blocked out the sun. Despite this, she continued the journey south into worsening weather, in a deep water passage between the North Queensland coastline and the Great Barrier Reef, known as the inner route. Although taking this route provided some protection from the open sea, captains had to navigate and thread their way through a number of then uncharted reefs. All passengers and crew expected to be in Newcastle on Sunday evening for a scheduled stopover.

Shipwreck

On the evening of 24 February 1875, the ship was still heading south in almost cyclonic conditions with fore, top and mainsails set and the steam engines running at full speed. Flooding rains lashed the entire Queensland coast and Captain Pearce reportedly could not see land or sun. Gothenburg struck with such force that she was left high up on the reef. Immediately, an order came out to lower the sails. At first, there was no panic and many passengers returned to their cabin bunks expecting Gothenburg would come off the reef at high tide.

In an attempt to refloat her, Captain Pearce ordered Gothenburg to be lightened forward. Water casks used as ballast and passengers were positioned aft in an endeavour to refloat her as the tide rose, but without success. Finally, a fatal attempt was made to refloat her, by reversing the engine hard. The vessel came half off the reef, but holed herself badly and then slewed broadside to the waves, in a much worse position. However, with the tide rising and some cargo now being dumped overboard, all aboard still expected Gothenburg to float free. With strong winds changing direction and seas increasing, the boiler fires were extinguished by water rising through the damaged stern. Around midnight, the chief engineer came on deck to report that the engine room was flooded and the engine was of no further use. With heavy seas now rushing down hatchways and into the cabins, Gothenburg was doomed and Captain Pearce was forced to admit that the situation had become desperate.

The storm made launching the lifeboats almost impossible. At about 3:00 am, Captain Pearce ordered the two port lifeboats lowered, each with four crew on board. While being passed astern one of the boats broke the painter and became adrift. Her crew tried hard to pull up to the ship's side, but it was impossible in the heavy squall. The other was accidentally let go and both boats, in heavy seas, were unable to be retrieved.

At about 3:30 am on Thursday, 25 February, Gothenburg continued to heel over. The deck became so steep that passengers and crew had to climb over the rails to get on her side. At about 4:00 am, the two remaining starboard lifeboats were lowered and were rushed by the passengers. One starboard lifeboat, crammed with women and children, capsized when others tried to board it. Some half dozen men righted her in the water, but, damaged and without oars, food or water, it quickly drifted away and was never found. The second starboard lifeboat also capsized when the sea crashed over, washing all the occupants into the sea. One passenger recalled the sea on the downwind side of the ship being covered with human heads bobbing up and down like corks. Five or six men and one woman climbed onto the upturned hull. The boat was still connected to its painter, but it was unable to be recovered from the heavy sea and wind which swept the woman off and drowned her. A passenger, John Cleland, swam to the connected, but upturned lifeboat and further secured it with a rope tied to Gothenburg. In less than fifteen minutes, nearly 100 people had drowned; washed away or trapped in their water-filled cabins. By this time, several sharks were circling the wreck.

Those still on board Gothenburg tried to cling to the rigging, but throughout the early morning of 25 February, several more people were drowned after they were swept overboard by large broadside waves. Many passengers associated with the gold diggings were unwilling to let go of their gold and money belts, as it was probably their life savings; these individuals insisted on keeping them tied and once overboard reportedly drowned very quickly.

Survivors
By morning of 25 February, only the masts were visible protruding from the water, with 14 people clinging to the rigging, where they remained for the next twenty four hours in cyclonic weather. At low tide, Gothenburg sank stern first and the wreck fell apart. However, the remaining starboard lifeboat, which had capsized, was still held by her painter and the rope attached by Cleland. At first light on 26 February the weather eased and the survivors managed to right the boat and bail it out; they prepared a makeshift sail and paddled for the mainland. About seven hours later they realised they could not make mainland, so they altered course for an island that could be seen in the distance. When they arrived, they were met by four of the crew from one of the port lifeboats. Their lifeboat had been severely damaged on the rocks on the opposite side of the island in an attempt to land there the day before. 

[[File:Gothenberg Turtle Shell.jpg|thumb|left|upright|Gothenburgss Turtle Shell Roll]]
The other port lifeboat, with four crew on board, was picked up by the steamer Leichhardt at an island at the entrance to Whitsunday Passage. The steamer immediately reversed course back towards the wreck, which she reached at about 3.30 pm on Friday, 26 February. Gothenburg was a complete wreck; the funnel was gone and she had sunk to the eyes of the lower rigging. Leichhardt'''s Chief Officer and four hands went alongside, but nothing other than her masts could be seen above the water except for the body of a naked man floating nearby. They assumed the other victims had been taken by sharks. Leichhardt searched for survivors until last light and then made way for Bowen where the alarm was raised.

At Holbourne Island, the other 18 survivors were living off raw bird's eggs and rain water that had pooled in the island rocks. Because rescue was uncertain, they engraved ship details and their names on the concave side of a large turtle shell, in the hope that it would be found in the future. On Sunday, 28 February 15 of them set off in the starboard lifeboat for an island about 20 miles away to the south, which appeared to be closer to the main shipping lane. A rescue ship, sent looking for survivors, picked up the group and took them safely to Bowen. Another rescue ship, Bunyip from Townsville, subsequently returned to Holbourne Island and rescued the three remaining survivors.

Aftermath
Although reports vary, records show that between 98 and 112 people drowned. Most records state the death toll at 102. Only 22 people survived (12 crew and 10 passengers). All 25 women and children aboard and all the officers died.

Edward W. Price, Magistrate and Commissioner Circuit Court of the Northern Territory, who remained behind in Darwin, lost his wife and six children. Devastated by the news, he was given six months leave on full pay by the government. The retired fifth Premier of South Australia, Thomas Reynolds and his wife, Anne, both drowned as did Eduard Durand, the French Vice Consul.

Other notable passengers who died were Dr James Millner and his family, Justice William A. Wearing QC, Circuit Court Judge; Joseph Whitby, acting South Australian Crown Solicitor; Richard Wells, NT Times & Gazette editor; Lionel Pelham, a senior public servant; Commander Andrew Ross of the Royal Navy; C. J. Lyons, Justice Wearing's senior assistant; William Shoobridge, Secretary to several mining companies; A. L. McKay, Government Surveyor; and several Overland Telegraph employees.

Never before in Australian history had so many high-profile public servants, dignitaries and diplomats died in a single tragedy. Many passengers who died were Darwin residents and news of the tragedy severely affected the small community, reportedly taking several years to recover. Most of Gothenburg's crew were from Melbourne and as a result of the shipwreck, 11 widows and 34 children were left destitute in Victoria.

At Bowen, twelve survivors left with Captain Lake on the ship Victoria headed for Sydney. They all got free passage from McMerkan, Blackwood and Co, the owners of Gothenburg. The four survivors from the second port lifeboat that were picked up by the steamer Leichhardt, remained with that ship and subsequently made way for Brisbane.

Two weeks later a hard-hat diver, sent down to recover the gold and other valuables, found the bodies of two women at the foot of the saloon staircase, one with her arm around the other. The diver tried to reach them to take a lock of hair or some other personal item that could be identified by their loved ones, but the restriction of the air line made it impossible. The gold in the Captain's cabin was recovered after much difficulty. While recovering the gold, several sharks that were caught near the wreck were found to contain human bones, remains and jewellery.

There were three heroes identified that tragic night, all attested to by all the other survivors, for their attempts to save other passengers. In recognition of their bravery, on 26 July 1875, the Governor of South Australia, Sir Anthony Musgrave, presented passengers James Fitzgerald and John Cleland and crewman Robert Brazil with gold medals and a gold watch. The Gothenburg Relief Fund Committee also presented each of them with a gold chain.

Report
The report of the Marine Board of Queensland determined that: 

Lifeboats
There was also much speculation at the time in the Adelaide and Melbourne press on why the lifeboats had not been launched earlier. Survivor James Fitzgerald pointed out in his recollection that, had the lifeboats been filled to capacity, no one would have survived the severe weather conditions experienced. He also commented that passenger vessels were not required to carry enough lifeboats, concluding that there were insufficient places for all Gothenburgs passengers and crew. It was not until RMS Titanic sank some 37 years later in 1912, that it was made compulsory for all British registered ships to carry enough lifeboats for everyone aboard.

Present day
Today, only parts of the deteriorated iron hull and the coal fired square boilers of Gothenburg remain. The Gothenburg shipwreck is registered on the Queensland National Estate (place ID #8923) as a Heritage site, and is protected under Section 7 of the (Commonwealth) Historic Shipwrecks Act 1976, which requires that divers have a permit to enter the 200m protected zone that has been declared around the wreck. The reef around the wreck provides good diving with an extensive coral garden. A strict non-disturbance policy applies to marine flora and fauna as well as to the fabric of the wreck. Pelagic fish and reef sharks are common.

Legacy

The northern Darwin suburb of Millner was named after Dr James Millner who, together with his family, lost their lives on Gothenburg. Most streets in the northern Darwin suburb of Coconut Grove and some in the adjacent suburb of Millner, were named after local Darwin residents, interstate visitors and crew who lost their lives in the shipwreck. Gothenburg Crescent, in the inner Darwin suburb of Stuart Park, was named after the ship.

The large turtle shell, which was engraved by the 18 survivors at Holbourne Island, is displayed at the South Australian Museum, on North Terrace in Adelaide.

Other references
By August 1866 there was a pub named The Gothenburg in Flinders Street west, Melbourne. It had an image of the ship above the entrance.
The pub, which had a raffish reputation, was renamed the Crown and Anchor'' around 1870, five years before the tragedy.

Survivors
In 1875, a detailed list of all passengers and crew was published by JH Lewis, Printer & Publisher, albeit with several errors and spelling mistakes. That document was used as the main source of the following survivors' table.

The survivors' surnames have been reconciled against rescue ships' log books, other records and a photo of the engraved turtle shell. Known discrepancies have been clarified, where possible, in the comments section.

Survivors

Full known passenger list

Full known crew list

See also

References

1854 ships
Australian Shipwrecks with protected zone
Barquentines of Australia
Great Barrier Reef
History of Australia (1851–1900)
History of Darwin, Northern Territory
Iron and steel steamships of Australia
Maritime incidents in April 1854
Maritime incidents in February 1875
North Queensland
Ships built in Millwall
Shipwrecks of Queensland
Victorian-era merchant ships of Australia
Victorian-era merchant ships of the United Kingdom
Wreck diving sites